Helen Hong (born July 7, 1985) is an American stand-up comedian, actress, director, and producer. She has appeared in such works as Jane the Virgin, Parks and Recreation, and the Coen Brothers' Inside Llewyn Davis. She has a regular spot on NPR's Wait Wait... Don't Tell Me! and hosts a trivia podcast called Go Fact Yourself. She formerly hosted the podcast Little Ethnic Girls. She has a recurring role on Nickelodeon's The Thundermans and had a recurring role as Mrs. Song in Starz's Blunt Talk. Hong is known for her comedic NowThis videos.

Early life
Hong's parents are immigrants to New York City from Korea. She was raised on the East Coast but spent some time in Korea as well. Hong attended high school at Tottenville High School in Staten Island, New York and North Andover High School in North Andover, Massachusetts and attended the University of Massachusetts in Amherst, Massachusetts.

Career
Hong was not a standup comedy fan before a random shot of inspiration prompted her to take standup classes at New York City's Carolines on Broadway. During the course of the class, she realized that standup was what she wanted to pursue as a career.

Hong has performed at The Laugh Factory, Bonkerz, The Hollywood Improv, Zanies Comedy Club, Stir Crazy Comedy Club, Flappers Comedy Club, The Ice House Comedy Club, the Mary D. Fisher Theatre, and numerous other venues.

Hong has performed at events such as the Sedona International Film Festival, the Punchlines & Pumps Comedy Show at the Potawatomi Hotel & Casino, the New York Underground Comedy Festival, and The Great American Comedy Festival.

Hong has also performed in Puerto Rico for Armed Services Entertainment.

Personal life
Helen Hong is the daughter of two Korean immigrants and was raised in New York. She has publicly expressed her passion for feminism movements and regularly shares her political stances and opinions on different forms of media. Helen is an active Bernie Sanders supporter.

Awards and recognition
In 2014, BuzzFeed named Hong as one of "18 Comedians Who Could Take Over The Late Show"
In 2011, The Huffington Post included her on their list "53 Of Our Favorite Female Comedians"

Filmography

Film

Television

References

External links
 
 Helen Hong official website

Living people
1985 births
American stand-up comedians
American people of Korean descent
Childfree
American women comedians